The Al Habtoor Tennis Challenge is a tournament for professional female tennis players, played on outdoor hardcourts. The event is classified as an ITF Women's Circuit tournament and has been held annually in Dubai, United Arab Emirates since 1998.

History 
The tournament began in 1998 as an $25,000 event. From 1999 to 2015, it was classified as a $75,000 event, however the 2004 edition was cancelled. In 2016, it was upgraded to a $100,000+H event.

Past finals

Singles

Doubles

External links 
 Official website
 ITF search

 
ITF Women's World Tennis Tour
Hard court tennis tournaments
Tennis tournaments in the United Arab Emirates
Recurring sporting events established in 1998
Sports competitions in Dubai
1998 establishments in the United Arab Emirates